Martineziana is a genus of aphodiine dung beetles in the family Scarabaeidae. There are about six described species in Martineziana.

Species
These six species belong to the genus Martineziana:
 Martineziana argentina (Harold, 1867)
 Martineziana dutertrei (Chalumeau, 1983)
 Martineziana excavaticollis (Blanchard, 1846)
 Martineziana separata (Schmidt, 1909)
 Martineziana simplex (Balthasar, 1963)
 Martineziana vandykei (Hinton, 1936)

References

Further reading

 
 
 

Scarabaeidae
Articles created by Qbugbot